The Lapoș oil field is an oil field located in Lapoș, Prahova County, Romania. It was discovered in 2006 and is being developed by Toreador Resources. It began production in 2015 and produces oil.

References

Oil fields in Romania